Holiday City-Berkeley is an unincorporated community and census-designated place (CDP) located within Berkeley Township, in Ocean County, New Jersey, United States. As of the 2010 United States Census, the CDP's population was 13,884.

Holiday City-Berkeley is a retirement community where residents must be over the age of 55 to own property and participate in community recreational activities.

Neighborhoods

Holiday City
In the Holiday City communities, homes are detached, ranch style built on minimum 50' x 100' lots, with some lots being larger to accommodate larger models.

Holiday City consists of five separate communities, each with its own homeowners association and amenities:

 Holiday City Berkeley
 Holiday City Carefree
 Holiday City West
 Holiday City South
 Holiday Heights

Silver Ridge
In the Silver Ridge Communities, homes are single-story detached on a crawl space, each with attached garage, and situated on 60' x 100' lots. Floor plans vary considerably. In addition to living room, dining room, eat-in-kitchen, attached garage, one or two bedrooms and one or two bathrooms, homes may also include family rooms/dens, open or closed porches, sun rooms, patios and decks.

The adult communities of Silver Ridge Park consist of four separate areas, each with its own homeowners association and amenities. These are:

 Silver Ridge Park East
 Silver Ridge Park West
 Silver Ridge Park - Westerly Extension
 Silver Ridge Park North

Geography
According to the United States Census Bureau, the CDP had a total area of 5.816 square miles (15.063 km2), including 5.752 square miles (14.898 km2) of land and 0.064 square miles (0.165 km2) of water (1.09%).

Demographics

Census 2010

Census 2000
As of the 2000 United States Census there were 13,884 people, 8,575 households, and 4,433 families living in the CDP. The population density was 930.7/km2 (2,410.9/mi2). There were 9,015 housing units at an average density of 604.3/km2 (1,565.4/mi2). The racial makeup of the CDP was 98.97% White, 0.38% African American, 0.01% Native American, 0.22% Asian, 0.01% Pacific Islander, 0.05% from other races, and 0.35% from two or more races. Hispanic or Latino of any race were 1.09% of the population.

There were 8,575 households, out of which 0.1% had children under the age of 18 living with them, 46.1% were married couples living together, 4.7% had a female householder with no husband present, and 48.3% were non-families. 46.3% of all households were made up of individuals, and 42.4% had someone living alone who was 65 years of age or older. The average household size was 1.58 and the average family size was 2.08.

In the CDP the population was spread out, with 0.1% under the age of 18, 0.4% from 18 to 24, 2.1% from 25 to 44, 13.6% from 45 to 64, and 83.8% who were 65 years of age or older. The median age was 76 years. For every 100 females, there were 65.9 males. For every 100 females age 18 and over, there were 65.8 males.

The median income for a household in the CDP was $26,900, and the median income for a family was $33,575. Males had a median income of $35,197 versus $26,149 for females. The per capita income for the CDP was $22,755. About 2.9% of families and 6.0% of the population were below the poverty line, including none of those under age 18 and 5.7% of those age 65 or over.

References

External links
 Holiday City at Berkeley

Berkeley Township, New Jersey
Census-designated places in Ocean County, New Jersey